Flavia Nabagabe Kalule (born April 22, 1985), is a Ugandan teacher, Inter-parliamentary union representative, women's rights activist and woman member of parliament for Kassanda district in the 11th parliament of the Republic of Uganda. She is chairperson of the women’s league  at National Unity Platform(NUP) party also known as People Power.

Background and education 
Flavia was born to the late Florence Nalwanga Kalule, who served as a Resident District Commissioner (RDC) for Mubende, Kabarole and Nakasongola districts on April 22, 1985 and late Dr. Lawrence Sserugo Kalule.

Flavia completed her primary level education at St Theresa’s Namagunga Primary Boarding School in 1998. She completed both her Secondary level education from Our Lady of Good Counsel Gayaza in 2004. She later joined Makerere University for Bachelor of Arts with Education and graduated in 2008.  In 2013, Flavia enrolled for a Masters in Arts in Human Rights at Makerere University.

In 2016, Flavia attended a leadership training programme in Kenya under the Young African Leaders Initiative (YALI) East African programme. In 2017, Flavia participated in the Mandela Washington Fellowship for Young African Leaders, a flagship programme of the United States (US) government’s YALI where she participated in a leadership training programme, civic engagement and public management.

Career

Teaching 
Flavia taught at Our Lady of Good Counsel in Gayaza. And later joined Namilyango College where she taught from 2008 to 2012.

Advocacy work 
In 2012, Flavia joined Forum for Women in Democracy (FOWODE) as an intern where she was later promoted to the position of programme officer.

Political career 
In 2016, Flavia contested and lost the position for Woman MP for Mubende District.  In 2021, Flavia contested and won the position for Woman Member of Parliament for Kassanda District under National Unity Platform (NUP). Flavia was appointed as chairperson of the women’s league for NUP, a committee that handles sexual harassment within the NUP political party.

See also 

 List of members of the eleventh Parliament of Uganda
 Ruth S Nankabirwa
 Parliament of Uganda
 National Unity Platform

References 

1985 births
Living people
21st-century Ugandan politicians
21st-century Ugandan women politicians
Women members of the Parliament of Uganda
Members of the Parliament of Uganda